John Laskey Woolcock (7 November 1861 – 18 January 1929) was a barrister and Supreme Court judge in Queensland, Australia.

Early life
Woolcock was born in St Clement, Cornwall, England, the son of the Rev. William Woolcock, a Bible Christian missionary, and Elizabeth née White. John Woolcock came to Queensland with his family in 1866, and was educated at the Normal School and Brisbane Grammar School. Having won a Queensland exhibition scholarship Woolcock attended the University of Sydney, graduating B.A. in 1883. Woolcock excelled in his course and won the gold medal for English verse, the Wentworth medal for an English essay, the George Allen and Renwick scholarships, and the Belmore medal for agricultural chemistry.

Career
Woolcock taught at Brisbane Grammar School and was later appointed private secretary to premier Sir Samuel Griffith; in that capacity Woolcock attended the colonial convention at Sydney in 1883, the federal council at Hobart in 1886, and the Imperial conference, London in 1887.
Woolcock qualified as a barrister and was called to the Queensland bar on 6 December 1887. In April 1899 Woolcock was appointed Queensland parliamentary counsel with the right to continue his large private practice. Woolcock published a six-volume consolidation of The Queensland Statutes with Marcus Hertzberg (1911). In December 1926, with the general approval of the profession, Woolcock was appointed a judge of the Supreme Court and began his duties on 1 February 1927, although his health was already in decline. Woolcock proved to be an able and hard-working judge, but died suddenly of endocarditis on 18 January 1929. Woolcock married twice; on 17 June 1891 to Miss Gertrude Mary Harper (d.1912) and subsequently on 27 May 1914 to Miss Ida Hague Withrington, who survived him with one son and one daughter of the first marriage and one son and one daughter of the second.

Legacy
Woolcock had high ideals, was studious, widely read, and was a hard worker. He wrote a good deal on legal questions such as the liquor act, the local authority act and Friendly Societies law, and was responsible for annotated issues of the justices' act and the health act. Woolcock also wrote detective stories and verse some of which appeared in the Queensland press; an example is included in A Book of Queensland Verse. He was a force in all educational matters and exercised much influence on them in Queensland. In 1895 with S. W. Brooks he initiated the movement for a public library at Brisbane, became a trustee when the library was established, and a member of the board of advice when it was taken over by the government. Woolcock was one of the original members of the University of Queensland senate (1910–16) and for some years was chairman of its education committee. He was especially interested in his old school, Brisbane Grammar School, of which he became a trustee in 1889, and chairman of trustees from 1906 until his death. Woolcock's will bequeathed £100 to the University of Queensland to found the Gertrude-Mary Woolcock memorial prize for proficiency in Greek.

References

External links
 
Woolcock John Laskey – Brisbane City Council Grave Location Search

1861 births
1922 deaths
People from Truro
Burials at Toowong Cemetery
Deaths from endocarditis
Supreme Court of Queensland
Judges of the Supreme Court of Queensland